TFF may stand for:

Festivals
 Taipei Film Festival, an annual film festival in Taipei, Taiwan
 Taormina Film Fest, international film festival in Taormina
 Telluride Film Festival, an annual film festival in Telluride, Colorado, USA
 TFF Rudolstadt, a music festival
 Torino Film Festival, international film festival in Turin
 Tribeca film festival, an annual event in New York City, USA

Sports
 Tanzania Football Federation
 Trelleborgs FF, a Swedish football club
 Turkish Football Federation

Others
 Tangential Flow Filtration, a technique in biochemistry
 Telematics Freedom Foundation, a non-profit organization based in Rome, Italy
 TESLA Test Facility, testing particle accelerator technology
 T flip-flop (or toggle flip-flop), one of the fundamental building blocks of digital electronics systems

See also
 Time to first fix (TTFF), the time it takes the receiver to calculate a valid GPS position for navigation after it has been switched on
 Tears for Fears, an English band